Maria Farrugia (born 9 January 2001) is a Maltese footballer who plays as a Midfielder for Durham in the English FA Women's Championship and for the Malta women's national team.

Club career
Growing up on the island of Gozo, Farrugia began playing football at the age of four. She would play on boys' teams until the U15 level. At the age of 11, she was selected to join the Malta Football Association Academy in Valletta, having to take the ferry to commute from Gozo to the main island. 

After graduating from the National Sport School, Malta, she moved to the UK, where she began training with Sunderland AFC's Foundation of Light. In 2019, she signed with Sunderland AFC Ladies, making her debut with the club in mid-February 2019, in a Northern Premier Division loss to Blackburn.

In July 2021, she signed a one-year extension with Sunderland. She was named the FA Women's Championship Player of the Week for the first week of the 2021-22 season.

After departing Sunderland, Farrugia joined Durham.

International career 
Farrugia has been capped for the Malta national team, appearing for the team during the UEFA Women's Euro 2021 qualifying cycle.

International goals

References

External links
 
 

2001 births
Living people
Maltese women's footballers
Maltese expatriate sportspeople in England
Expatriate women's footballers in England
Malta women's international footballers
Women's association football midfielders
Sunderland A.F.C. Ladies players
Durham W.F.C. players
Malta women's youth international footballers